Dené–Caucasian is a proposed language family that includes widely-separated language groups spoken in the Northern Hemisphere: Sino-Tibetan languages, Yeniseian languages, Burushaski and North Caucasian languages in Asia; Na-Dené languages in North America; and the Vasconic languages from Europe (including Basque).

A narrower connection specifically between North American Na-Dené and Siberian Yeniseian (the Dené–Yeniseian languages hypothesis) was proposed by Edward Vajda in 2008, and has met with some acceptance within the community of professional linguists. The validity of the rest of the family, however, is viewed as doubtful or rejected by nearly all historical linguists.

History of the hypothesis

Classifications similar to Dené–Caucasian were put forward in the 20th century by Alfredo Trombetti, Edward Sapir, Robert Bleichsteiner, Karl Bouda, E. J. Furnée, René Lafon, Robert Shafer, Olivier Guy Tailleur, Morris Swadesh, Vladimir N. Toporov, and other scholars.

Morris Swadesh included all of the members of Dené–Caucasian in a family that he called "Basque-Dennean" (when writing in English, 2006/1971: 223) or "vascodene" (when writing in Spanish, 1959: 114). It was named for Basque and Navajo, the languages at its geographic extremes. According to Swadesh (1959: 114), it included "Basque, the Caucasian languages, Ural-Altaic, Dravidian, Tibeto-Burman, Chinese, Austronesian, Japanese, Chukchi (Siberia), Eskimo-Aleut, Wakash, and Na-Dene", and possibly "Sumerian". Swadesh's Basque-Dennean thus differed from Dené–Caucasian in including (1) Uralic, Altaic, Japanese, Chukotian, and Eskimo-Aleut (languages which are classed as Eurasiatic by the followers of Sergei Starostin and those of Joseph Greenberg), (2) Dravidian, which is classed as Nostratic by Starostin's school, and (3) Austronesian (which according to Starostin is indeed related to Dené–Caucasian, but only at the next stage up, which he termed Dené–Daic, and only via Austric (see Starostin's Borean macrofamily)). Swadesh's colleague Mary Haas attributes the origin of the Basque-Dennean hypothesis to Edward Sapir.

In the 1980s, Sergei Starostin, using strict linguistic methods (proposing regular phonological correspondences, reconstructions, glottochronology, etc.), became the first to put the idea that the Caucasian, Yeniseian and Sino-Tibetan languages are related on firmer ground. In 1991, Sergei L. Nikolaev added the Na-Dené languages to Starostin's classification.

The inclusion of the Na-Dené languages has been somewhat complicated by the ongoing dispute over whether Haida belongs to the family. The proponents of the Dené–Caucasian hypothesis incline towards supporters of Haida's membership in Na-Dené, such as Heinz-Jürgen Pinnow or, most recently, John Enrico. Edward J. Vajda, who otherwise rejects the Dené–Caucasian hypothesis, has suggested that Tlingit, Eyak, and the Athabaskan languages are closely related to the Yeniseian languages, but he denies any genetic relationship of the former three to Haida. Vajda's ideas on the relationship of Athabaskan–Eyak–Tlingit and Yeniseian have found support independently in works of various authors, including Heinrich K. Werner or Merritt Ruhlen. DNA analyses have not shown any special connection between the modern Ket population and the modern speakers of the Na-Dené languages.

In 1996, John D. Bengtson added the Vasconic languages (including Basque, its extinct relative or ancestor Aquitanian, and possibly Iberian), and in 1997 he proposed the inclusion of Burushaski. The same year, in his article for Mother Tongue, Bengtson concluded that Sumerian might have been a remnant of a distinct subgroup of the Dené–Caucasian languages. However, two other papers on the genetic affinity of Sumerian appeared in the same volume: while Allan R. Bomhard considered Sumerian to be a sister of Nostratic, Igor M. Diakonoff compared it to the Munda languages.

In 1998, Vitaly V. Shevoroshkin rejected the Amerind affinity of the Almosan (Algonquian-Wakashan) languages, suggesting instead that they had a relationship with Dené–Caucasian. Several years later, he offered a number of lexical and phonological correspondences between the North Caucasian, Salishan, and Wakashan languages, concluding that Salishan and Wakashan may represent a distinct branch of North Caucasian and that their separation from it must postdate the dissolution of the Northeast Caucasian unity (Avar-Andi-Tsezian), which took place around the 2nd or 3rd millennium BC.

Evidence for Dené–Caucasian

The existence of Dené–Caucasian is supported by:

 Many words that correspond between some or all of the families referred to Dené–Caucasian.
 The presence in the shared vocabulary of words that are rarely borrowed or otherwise replaced, such as personal pronouns (see below).
 Elements of grammar, such as verb prefixes and their positions (see below), noun class prefixes (see below), and case suffixes that are shared between at least some of the component families.
 A reconstruction of the sound system, the basic parts of the grammar, and much of the vocabulary of the macrofamily's most recent common ancestor, the so-called Proto-Dené–Caucasian language.

Potential problems include:

 The somewhat heavy reliance on the reconstruction of Proto-(North-)Caucasian by Starostin and Nikolayev. This reconstruction contains much uncertainty due to the extreme complexity of the sound systems of the Caucasian languages; the sound correspondences between these languages are difficult to trace.
 The use of the reconstruction of Proto-Sino-Tibetan by Peiros and Starostin, parts of which have been criticized on various grounds, although Starostin himself has proposed a few revisions. All reconstructions of Proto-Sino-Tibetan suffer from the facts that many languages of the huge Sino-Tibetan family are underresearched and that the shape of the Sino-Tibetan tree is poorly known and partly controversial.
 The use of Starostin's reconstruction of Proto-Yeniseian rather than the competing one by Vajda or that by Werner.
 The use of Bengtson's reconstruction of Proto-/Pre-Basque rather than Trask's.
 The slow progress in the reconstruction of Proto-Na-Dené, so that Haida and Athabaskan–Eyak–Tlingit have so far mostly been considered separately.

Shared pronominal morphemes
Several roots can be reconstructed for the 1st and 2nd person singular pronouns. This may indicate that there were pronouns with irregular declension (suppletion) in Proto-Dené–Caucasian, like "I" vs "me" throughout Indo-European. In the presumed daughter languages some of the roots are often affixes (such as verb prefixes or possessive noun prefixes) instead of independent pronouns.

The Algic, Salishan, Wakashan, and Sumerian comparisons should be regarded as especially tentative because regular sound correspondences between these families and the more often accepted Dené–Caucasian families have not yet been reconstructed. To a lesser degree this also holds for the Na-Dené comparisons, where only a few sound correspondences have yet been published.

/V/ means that the vowel in this position has not been successfully reconstructed. /K/ could have been any velar or uvular plosive, /S/ could have been any sibilant or assibilate.

All except Algic, Salishan and Wakashan are taken from Bengtson (2008).

Footnotes:
1 On Caucasian evidence alone, this word cannot be reconstructed for Proto-Caucasian or even Proto-East Caucasian; it is only found in Lak and Dargwa (Bengtson 2008:94). 
2 The final  found in Sumerian pronouns is the ergative ending. The Emesal dialect has . 
3 Proto-Athabaskan , Haida dii . 
4 Also in Proto-Southern Wakashan.
5 1st pl.. 
6 Tlingit xa , Eyak -, . 
7 Masculine verb prefix. 
8 Proto-Athabaskan -, Tlingit ÿi  > yi  = 2nd pl.; Tlingit i , Eyak  "thou". 
9 Feminine verb prefix. 
10 Proto-Athabaskan -, Haida dang /dàŋ/, Tlingit wa.é , where the hypothesis of a connection between the Proto-Athabaskan and Haida forms on the one hand and the rest on the other hand requires ad hoc assumptions of assimilation and dissimilation (Bengtson 2008: 94). 
11 Feminine. 
12 Proto-Athabaskan -, Eyak -, Tlingit wé , Haida 'wa . 
13 2nd sg.

Shared noun class pre- and infixes

Noun classification occurs in the North Caucasian languages, Burushaski, Yeniseian, and the Na-Dené languages. In Basque and Sino-Tibetan, only fossilized vestiges of the prefixes remain. One of the prefixes, */s/-, seems to be abundant in Haida, though again fossilized.

The following table with its footnotes, except for Burushaski, is taken from Bengtson (2008).

Footnotes:
a In Basque, the class prefixes became fossilized.
b In many Caucasian languages (28), systems of this type more or less persist to this day, especially in the East Caucasian languages, whereas in West Caucasian, only Abkhaz and Abaza preserve a distinction human-nonhuman. The Roman numbers are those conventionally used for the East Caucasian noun classes. The forms in parentheses are very rare.
c Burushaski seems to have reversed the first two animate classes, which may have parallels in some East Caucasian languages, namely Rutul, Tsakhur, or Kryz.
d As with Basque, the class system was already obsolete by the time the languages were recorded.
e Objective verb prefixes; /a/ and /i/ are used in the present tense, /o/ and /id/ in the past.

Verb morphology

In general, many Dené–Caucasian languages (and Sumerian) have polysynthetic verbs with several prefixes in front of the verb stem, but usually few or no suffixes. (The big exceptions are East Caucasian, where there is usually only one prefix and many suffixes, the similarly suffixing Haida, and Sino-Tibetan, for which little morphology can so far be reconstructed at all; Classical Tibetan with its comparatively rich morphology has at most two prefixes and one suffix. In Burushaski, the number of suffixes can surpass the rather large number of prefixes.)

The following is an example of a Kabardian (West Caucasian) verb from Bengtson (2008:98):

Bengtson (2008) suggests correspondences between some of these prefixes (sometimes suffixes) and between their positions.

For example, a preverb /t/- occurs in Yeniseian languages and appears in position −3 (Ket) or −4 (Kott) in the verb template (where the verb stem is in position 0, suffix positions get positive numbers, and prefix positions negative numbers). In Burushaski, a fossilized preverb /d/- appears in position −3. In Basque, an element d- appears in position −3 of auxiliary verbs in the present tense unless a first or second person absolutive agreement marker occupies that position instead. The Na-Dené languages have a "classifier" /d/- (Haida, Tlingit, Eyak) or */də/- (Proto-Athabaskan) that is either fossilized or has a vaguely transitive function (reflexive in Tlingit) and appears in position −3 in Haida. In Sino-Tibetan, Classical Tibetan has a "directive" prefix /d/-, and Nung has a causative prefix /d/- (positions do not apply because Sino-Tibetan verbs have at most two prefixes depending on the language).

A past tense marker /n/ is found in Basque, Caucasian, Burushaski, Yeniseian, and Na-Dené (Haida, Tlingit and Athabaskan); in all of these except Yeniseian, it is a suffix or circumfix, which is noteworthy in these (with the exception of East Caucasian and Haida) suffix-poor language families.

Another prefix /b/ is found in some Sino-Tibetan languages; in Classical Tibetan it marks the past tense and precedes other prefixes (if any). It may correspond to the Tlingit perfect prefix wu-/woo- /wʊ, wu/, which occurs in position −2, and the fossilized Haida wu-/w- /wu, w/ which occurs in verbs with "resultative/perfect" meanings.

"There are also some commonalities in the sequential ordering of verbal affixes: typically the transitive/causative *s- is directly before the verb stem (−1), a pronominal agent or patient in the next position (−2). If both subject/agent and object/patient are referenced in the same verbal chain, the object typically precedes the subject (OSV or OVS, where V is the verb stem): cf. Basque, West Caucasian [see table above], Burushaski, Yeniseian, Na-Dené, Sumerian templates […]. [Footnote: "Alone in N[a]-D[ene] Eyak allows for subjects and objects in a suffix position."] In Yeniseian (position −5) [...] and Na-Dene (position −5) [...] noun stems or (secondary) verb stems can be incorporated into the verbal chain." (Bengtson 2008:108)

The mentioned "transitive/causative" */s/- is found in Haida, Tlingit, Sino-Tibetan, Burushaski, possibly Yeniseian ("an 'empty' morpheme occupying the position of object in intransitive verbs with an animate subject"; Bengtson 2008:107) and maybe in Basque. A causative suffix *-/s/ is found in many Nostratic languages, too, but its occurrence as a prefix and its position in the prefix chain may nevertheless be innovations of Dené–Caucasian.

Family tree proposals

Starostin's theory
The Dené–Caucasian family tree and approximate divergence dates (estimated by modified glottochronology) proposed by S. A. Starostin and his colleagues from the Tower of Babel project:

1. Dené–Caucasian languages [8,700 BCE]
1.1. Na-Dené languages (Athabascan–Eyak–Tlingit)
1.2. Sino-Vasconic languages [7,900 BCE]
1.2.1. Vasconic (see below)
1.2.2. Sino-Caucasian languages [6,200 BCE]
1.2.2.1. Burushaski
1.2.2.2. Caucaso-Sino-Yeniseian [5,900 BCE]
1.2.2.2.1. North Caucasian languages
1.2.2.2.2. Sino-Yeniseian [5,100 BCE]
1.2.2.2.2.1. Yeniseian languages
1.2.2.2.2.2. Sino-Tibetan languages

Bengtson's theory
John D. Bengtson groups Basque, Caucasian and Burushaski together in a Macro-Caucasian (earlier Vasco-Caucasian) family (see the section on Macro-Caucasian below). According to him, it is as yet premature to propose other nodes or subgroupings, but he notes that Sumerian seems to share the same number of isoglosses with the (geographically) western branches as with the eastern ones:

1. Dené–Caucasian
1.1. The Macro-Caucasian family
1.1.1. Basque
1.1.2. North Caucasian
1.1.3. Burushaski
1.2. Sumerian
1.3. Sino-Tibetan
1.4. Yeniseian
1.5. Na-Dené

Proposed subbranches

Macro-Caucasian

John Bengtson (2008) proposes that, within Dené–Caucasian, the Caucasian languages form a branch together with Basque and Burushaski, based on many shared word roots as well as shared grammar such as:

 the consonant -, which is inserted between the components of some Basque compound nouns and can be compared to the East Caucasian element - which is inserted between the noun stem and the endings of cases other than the ergative.
 the presence of compound case endings (agglutinated from the suffixes of two different cases) in all three branches.
 the case endings themselves:

This suffix may therefore be shared among a larger group, possibly Dené–Caucasian as a whole. On the other hand, comparison of noun morphology among Dené–Caucasian families other than Basque, Burushaski and Caucasian is usually not possible: little morphology can so far be reconstructed for Proto-Sino-Tibetan at all; "Yeniseian has case marking, but it seems to have little in common with the western DC families" except for the abovementioned suffix (Bengtson 2008:footnote 182, emphasis added); and Na-Dené languages usually express case relations as prefixes on the polysynthetic verb. It can therefore not be excluded that some or all of the noun morphology presented here was present in Proto-Dené–Caucasian and lost in Sino-Tibetan, Yeniseian and Na-Dené; in this case it cannot be considered evidence for the Macro-Caucasian hypothesis. That said, as mentioned above, Basque, Caucasian and Burushaski also share words that do not occur in other families.

A genitive suffix -/nV/ is also widespread among Nostratic languages.

Karasuk

George van Driem has proposed that the Yeniseian languages are the closest known relatives of Burushaski, based on a small number of similarities in grammar and lexicon. The Karasuk theory as proposed by van Driem does not address other language families that are hypothesized to belong to Dené–Caucasian, so whether the Karasuk hypothesis is compatible or not with the Macro-Caucasian hypothesis remains to be investigated.

See also
Dené–Yeniseian languages
Language families and languages
Proto-language
Borean languages
Haplogroup C-M217 (Y-DNA)
Sino-Uralic

Footnotes

References

BENEDICT, Paul K., 1972. Sino-Tibetan: A Conspectus: 103ff; Ed. by J. A. Matisoff. Cambridge University Press.

BENGTSON, John D., 2004. "Some features of Dene–Caucasian phonology (with special reference to Basque)." In Cahiers de l'Institut de Linguistique de Louvain (CILL): 33–54.
BENGTSON, John D., 2003. "Notes on Basque Comparative Phonology." Mother Tongue 8: 21–39.
BENGTSON, John D., 2002. "The Dene–Caucasian noun prefix *s-." In The Linguist's Linguist: A Collection of Papers in Honour of Alexis Manaster Ramer, ed. by F. Cavoto, pp. 53–57. Munich: LINCOM Europa.
BENGTSON, John D., 1999a. "Review of R.L. Trask, The History of Basque." In Romance Philology 52 (Spring): 219–224.
BENGTSON, John D., 1999b. "Wider genetic affiliations of the Chinese language." Journal of Chinese Linguistics 27 (1): 1–12.*BENGTSON, John D., 1994. "Edward Sapir and the 'Sino-Dene' Hypothesis." Anthropological Science (Tokyo) 102: 207-230.
BENGTSON, John D., 1998. "Caucasian and Sino-Tibetan: A Hypothesis of S. A. Starostin." General Linguistics, Vol. 36, no. 1/2, 1998 (1996). Pegasus Press, University of North Carolina, Asheville, North Carolina.
BENGTSON, John D., 1997a. "Ein Vergleich von Buruschaski und Nordkaukasisch [A comparison of B. and North Caucasian]." Georgica 20: 88–94.
BENGTSON, John D., 1997b. "The riddle of Sumerian: A Dene–Caucasic language?" Mother Tongue 3: 63–74.
BENGTSON, John D., 1996. "A Final (?) Response to the Basque Debate in Mother Tongue 1." (see External links below)
BERGER, Hermann, 1998. Die Burushaski-Sprache von Hunza und Nager. 3 volumes. Wiesbaden: Harrassowitz.
BERGER, Hermann, 1974. Das Yasin-Burushaski (Werchikwar). Wiesbaden: Harrassowitz.
BOMHARD, Allan R., 1997. "On the origin of Sumerian." Mother Tongue 3: 75-93.
CATFORD, J. C., 1977. "Mountain of Tongues: The languages of the Caucasus." Annual Review of Anthropology 6: 283-314.
DIAKONOFF, Igor M., 1997. "External Connections of the Sumerian Language." Mother Tongue 3: 54-63.
ENRICO, John. 2004. Toward Proto–Na-Dene. Anthropological Linguistics 46(3).229–302.

KOROTAYEV, Andrey, and KAZANKOV, Alexander, 2000. "Regions Based on Social Structure: A Reconsideration". Current Anthropology 41/5 (October, 2000): 668–69.
CHIRIKBA, Vyacheslav A., 1985. "Баскский и северокавказские языки [Basque and the North Caucasian languages]." In Древняя Анатолия [Ancient Anatolia], pp. 95-105. Moscow: Nauka.
NIKOLA(Y)EV, Sergei L., 1991. "Sino-Caucasian Languages in America." In Shevoroshkin (1991), pp. 42–66.
PEIROS, Ilia, and STAROSTIN, Sergei A., 1996. "A comparative vocabulary of five Sino-Tibetan languages". University of Melbourne Department of Linguistics and Applied Linguistics.
PINNOW, Heinz-Jürgen (1990a). Die Na-Dene-Sprachen im Lichte der Greenberg-Klassifikation [The Na-Dene languages in the light of the Greenberg classification]. Nortorf: Völkerkundliche Arbeitsgemeinschaft. (Abhandlungen, Heft 64)
PINNOW, Heinz-Jürgen (1990b) (in two parts). Vogelnamen des Tlingit und Haida. Materialien zu ihrer sprachhistorischen Erforschung sowie Auflistung der Vogelarten von Alaska [Bird names of Tlingit and Haida. Materials to their language-historical investigation and list of the bird species of Alaska]. Nortorf: Völkerkundliche Arbeitsgemeinschaft. (Abhandlungen, Hefte 67–68)
PINNOW, Heinz-Jürgen (1988). Verwandtschafts- und andere Personenbezeichnungen im Tlingit und Haida: Versuch ihrer sprachhistorischen Deutung [Kinship and other person terms in Tlingit and Haida: attempt at their language-historical interpretation]. Nortorf: Völkerkundliche Arbeitsgemeinschaft. (Abhandlungen, Heft 62)
PINNOW, Heinz-Jürgen (1986a). Die Zahlwörter des Haida in sprachvergleichender Sicht [The numerals of Haida in comparative view]. Nortorf: Völkerkundliche Arbeitsgemeinschaft. (Abhandlungen, Heft 47)
PINNOW, Heinz-Jürgen (1986b). Säugetiernamen des Haida und Tlingit: Materialien zu ihrer historischen Erforschung [Mammal names of Haida and Tlingit: materials to their historical investigation]. Nortorf: Völkerkundliche Arbeitsgemeinschaft. (Abhandlungen, Heft 50)
PINNOW, Heinz-Jürgen (1985a). Sprachhistorische Untersuchung einiger Tiernamen im Haida (Fische, Stachelhäuter, Weichtiere, Gliederfüßer, u.a.) [Language-historical investigation of some animal names in Haida (fish, echinoderms, mollusks, arthropods, and others)]. Nortorf: Völkerkundliche Arbeitsgemeinschaft. (Abhandlungen, Heft 39)
PINNOW, Heinz-Jürgen (1985b) (in four parts). Das Haida als Na-Dene-Sprache [Haida as a Na-Dene language]. Nortorf: Völkerkundliche Arbeitsgemeinschaft. (Abhandlungen, Hefte 43–46)
RUBICZ, R., MELVIN, K. L., CRAWFORD, M.H. 2002. Genetic Evidence for the phylogenetic relationship between Na-Dene and Yeniseian speakers. Human Biology, Dec 1 2002 74 (6) 743-761.
RUHLEN, Merritt, 2001a. "Il Dene–caucasico: una nuova famiglia linguistica." Pluriverso 2: 76–85.
RUHLEN, Merritt, 2001b. "Taxonomic Controversies in the Twentieth Century", in New Essays on the Origin of Language, ed. by Jürgen Trabant and Sean Ward, Berlin, Mouton de Gruyter, 197–214.
RUHLEN, Merritt, 1998a. "Dene–Caucasian: A New Linguistic Family," in The Origins and Past of Modern Humans—Towards Reconciliation, ed. by Keiichi Omoto and Phillip V. Tobias, Singapore: World Scientific, 231–46.
RUHLEN, Merritt, 1998b. "The Origin of the Na-Dene." Proceedings of the National Academy of Sciences of the U.S.A. 95: 13994–13996.
RUHLEN, Merritt, 1998c. "The Origin of the Na-Dene." Proceedings of the National Academy of Sciences 95: 13994–96.
RUHLEN, Merritt. 1997. "Une nouvelle famille de langues: le déné-caucasien," Pour la Science (Dossier, October), 68–73.
SCHMIDT, Karl Horst, 1994. "Class Inflection and Related Categories in the Caucasus." In Non-Slavic Languages of the USSR, ed. by H. I. Aronson, pp. 185-192. Columbus, OH: Slavica.
SCHULZE-FÜRHOFF, Wolfgang, 1992. "How Can Class Markers Petrify? Towards a Functional Diachrony of Morphological Subsystems in the East Caucasian Languages." In The Non-Slavic Languages of the USSR: Linguistic Studies, Second Series, ed. by H. I. Aronson, pp. 183-233. Chicago: Chicago Linguistic Society.
SHEVOROSHKIN, Vitaliy V., 2004. "Proto-Salishan and Proto-North-Caucasian Consonants: a few cognate sets." in Nostratic Centennial Conference: the Pécs Papers. ed. by. I. Hegedűs & P. Sidwell, pp. 181–191. Pécs: Lingua Franca Group.
SHEVOROSHKIN, Vitaliy V., 2003. "Salishan and North Caucasian." Mother Tongue 8: 39–64.
STAROSTIN, Sergei A. and Orel, V., 1989. "Etruscan and North Caucasian." Explorations in Language Macrofamilies. Ed. V. Shevoroshkin. Bochum Publications in Evolutionary Cultural Semiotics. 23. Bochum.
SHEVOROSHKIN, Vitaliy V., 1999 "Nostratic and Sino-Caucasian: two ancient language phyla." In From Neanderthal to Easter Island (Festschrift W. W. Schuhmacher), ed. by N. A. Kirk & P. J. Sidwell. pp. 44–74. Melbourne.

SHEVOROSHKIN, Vitaliy V., 1991. (Ed.) Dene–Sino-Caucasian Languages. Bochum: Brockmeyer.
STAROSTIN, Sergei A., 2004–2005. Sino-Caucasian [comparative phonology] & Sino-Caucasian [comparative glossary].
STAROSTIN, Sergei A., 2002. "A response to Alexander Vovin's criticism of the Sino-Caucasian theory." Journal of Chinese Linguistics 30.1:142–153.
STAROSTIN, Sergei A., 2000. "Genesis of the Long Vowels in Sino-Tibetan." In Проблемы изучения дальнего родства языков на рыбеже третьего тысячелетия: Доклады и тезисы международной конференции РГГУ [Problems of the research on the distant origin of languages at the beginning of the third millennium: Talks and abstracts of the international conference of the RGGU], Moscow 2000.
STAROSTIN, Sergei A., 1996. "Word-final resonants in Sino-Caucasian." Journal of Chinese Linguistics 24.2: 281–311. (written for the 3rd International Conference on Chinese Linguistics in Hongkong in 1994)
STAROSTIN, Sergei A., 1995. "Old Chinese Basic Vocabulary: A Historical Perspective." In The Ancestry of the Chinese Language (Journal of Chinese Linguistics Monograph No. 8), ed. by W. S.-Y. Wang, pp. 225–251. Berkeley, CA.

 [Translation of Starostin 1984]
 [See Starostin 1991 for English translation]

TRASK, R. L., 1999. "Why should a language have any relatives?" Pages 157–176 in: C. Renfrew & D. Nettle (eds.): Nostratic: Examining a Linguistic Macrofamily, McDonald Institute for Archaeological Research, Cambridge (UK).
TRASK, R. L., 1997. "Basque and the Superfamilies". The History of Basque, Routledge, London. (See especially pages 403–408.)
TRASK, R. L., 1995. "Basque and Dene–Caucasian: A Critique from the Basque Side". Mother Tongue 1:3–82.
TRASK, R. L., 1994–1995. "Basque: The Search for Relatives (Part 1)." Dhumbadji! 2:3–54.
VAJDA, Edward J. (2004): Ket. (Languages of the World, Materials, 204) München: LINCOM Europa
VAJDA, Edward J. (2002): The origin of phonemic tone in Yeniseic. CLS 37 (Parasession on Arctic languages): 305-320
VAJDA, Edward J. (2001a): Toward a typology of position class: comparing Navajo and Ket verb morphology. Read at: SSILA Summer Meeting, July 7, 2001
VAJDA, Edward J. (2001b): Linguistic relations across Bering Strait: Siberia and the Native Americans. Read at: Bureau of Faculty Research, Western Washington University, Bellingham, WA, March 8, 2001
VAJDA, Edward J. 2000. Evidence for a genetic connection between Na-Dene and Yeniseian (Central Siberia). – Paper read at: January 2000 meeting of Society for the Study of Indigenous Languages of America (SSILA) and Linguistic Society of America (LSA)
VAJDA, Edward J. 2000a. Yeniseian and Na-Dene: evidence for a genetic relationship. – Paper read at: 38th Conference on American Indian Languages (SSILA), Chicago, Jan. 2000
VAJDA, Edward J. 2000b. Yeniseian and Athabaskan–Eyak–Tlingit.' – Paper read at: Linguistics Department Colloquium, University of British Columbia, Mar. 2000
VAJDA, Edward J. 2000c. Ket verb morphology and its parallels with Athabaskan–Eyak–Tlingit: evidence of a genetic link. – Paper read at: Athabaskan Language Conference, Moricetown, BC, June 9, 2000
VAJDA, Edward J. 2000d. Athabaskan–Eyak–Tlingit and Yeniseian: lexical and phonological parallels. Read at: 39th Conference on American Indian Languages, San Francisco, Nov. 14-18, 2000
VAN DRIEM, George, 2001. "The Languages of the Himalayas." Brill, Leiden.
VOVIN, Alexander, 2002. "Building a 'bum-pa for Sino-Caucasian." Journal of Chinese Linguistics 30.1: 154–171.
VOVIN, Alexander, 1997. "The Comparative Method and Ventures Beyond Sino-Tibetan." Journal of Chinese Linguistics 25.2: 308–336.
WERNER, Heinrich K. (2004): Zur jenissejisch-indianischen Urverwandtschaft [On the Yeniseian-[American] Indian primordial relationship]. Wiesbaden: Harrassowitz

Further reading
Nikolayev, Sergei. 2014. Possible Dene-Caucasian cognates. The 9th Annual Sergei Starostin Memorial Conference on Comparative Historical Linguistics. Moscow: RSUH.
Starostin, George. 2014. Basque / North Caucasian lexical matches on the 50-item wordlist. 9th Annual Readings in memory of S. Starostin. Moscow, RSUH, March 27-28, 2014.
Vajda, Edward. 2013. Assessing the Sino-Caucasian Hypothesis. Comparative-Historical Linguistics of the XXIst Century: Issues and Perspectives. Institute for Oriental and Classical Studies, Russian State University for the Humanities. Moscow, March 20-22, 2013.

External links
Moscow Lexical Database (MosLex) by Alexei Kassian, which compares basic vocabulary for Dené-Caucasian languages
Dené–Caucasian ethno-linguistic map
The Tower of Babel (site in English and Russian including Proposed family tree and Word-final resonants in Sino-Caucasian)
A Final (?) Response to the Basque Debate in Mother Tongue 1 (GIF)
Merritt Ruhlen on the Dené–Caucasian hypothesis(PDF)

 
Proposed language families